WSVN (channel 7) is a television station in Miami, Florida, United States, affiliated with the Fox network. It is the flagship station of locally based Sunbeam Television. WSVN's studios are located on 79th Street Causeway (SR 934) in North Bay Village (though with a Miami postal address), and its transmitter is located in Miami Gardens, Florida.

History

WCKT
The station first signed on the air on July 29, 1956, as WCKT. Originally operating as an NBC affiliate, it was founded by the Biscayne Television Corporation, a partnership between the Cox and Knight publishing families (from which the original call letters were derived [Cox Knight Television]), who respectively owned Miami's two major newspapers: the now-defunct Miami News and the still-operating Miami Herald. The same Cox/Knight partnership also owned WCKR radio (610 AM, now WIOD, and 97.3 FM, now WFLC). Niles Trammell, a former NBC president, held a 15 percent ownership interest in WCKT.

Before WCKT signed on, NBC programming had been carried on Fort Lauderdale's WFTL-TV (channel 23, later known as WGBS-TV after it had been acquired by Storer Broadcasting), which also held a secondary affiliation with the DuMont Television Network. However, WFTL struggled because television sets were not required to have UHF tuning capability (the Federal Communications Commission (FCC) would later require such tuners to be included in sets manufactured from 1964 onward). It didn't help matters that much of the area, particularly Fort Lauderdale, got a fairly strong signal from WJNO-TV (channel 5, now WPTV) in West Palm Beach. When the Cox/Knight partnership won a construction permit and broadcast license to operate a station on VHF channel 7, NBC quickly agreed to move its affiliation to WCKT, since WCKR radio had been the longtime Miami affiliate of the NBC Blue Network (the forerunner to today's American Broadcasting Company (ABC)). Until WPST-TV (channel 10, now WPLG) signed on in August 1957, WCKT also shared ABC programming with WTVJ (channel 4), as part of an arrangement with the network to provide its programming throughout the market as television sets were not required to have UHF tuning capability at the time, preventing many in the area from receiving the market's original ABC affiliate, WITV (channel 17). Channel 23 became an independent station and eventually went dark, and later came back to the air in 1967 as WAJA-TV (it is now Univision flagship WLTV-DT).

In 1962, the Cox/Knight/Trammell partnership was stripped of its broadcast licenses due to violations of the FCC's licensing rules and ethics violations. In hearings that began in June 1960, it was found that some of the principals of Biscayne Television, as well as some of James Cox's personal friends, had made improper contact with FCC commissioner Richard Mack in order to influence the awarding of the construction permit and licenses. Biscayne had competed for the license with two other applicants, East Coast Television and South Florida TV. Mack had also been found guilty of taking payoffs and was forced to resign by President Dwight D. Eisenhower, as well as the rest of the FCC commissioners.

Biscayne Television originally planned to appeal its license revocation, but was advised that the appeal would be turned down due to the gravity of the situation. Mack had also been found guilty of taking payoffs in the licensing process of WPST, to the broadcasting subsidiary of National Airlines. WPST had its license revoked and Biscayne then opted to put WCKT up for sale. The owners of WPST were forced to sell the station only after they had to cease broadcasting.

Sunbeam Television ownership
Shortly afterward, a new company called Sunbeam Television Corporation bought the station for $3.4 million and assumed ownership of channel 7 on December 19, 1962. Upon the change in ownership, Sunbeam retained the WCKT call letters and claimed the Cox/Knight station's history as its own. Sunbeam was a partnership between Miami Beach–based real estate developer Sydney Ansin, and his son Edmund Ansin. The younger Ansin succeeded his father as president of Sunbeam Television in 1971. The station began using its own version of the circle 7 logo (which is moderately similar to the version originally created for ABC's owned-and-operated stations, but with the "7" not connected to the circle and being somewhat shaped differently) in the mid-1970s. On June 7, 1983, the station's callsign was changed to the current WSVN, after those call letters were acquired from a PBS satellite member station in Norton, Virginia (which subsequently became WSBN-TV; it went off the air in 2017).

Network affiliation switch
NBC experienced a resurgence in the second half of the 1980s, resulting in it becoming the top-rated U.S. television network–a status helped by the crime drama Miami Vice, which was set and filmed in and around Miami. The Miami–Fort Lauderdale area was also developing into one of the largest media markets in the United States. But NBC's standing in the area was deemed unsatisfactory, as WSVN was the third-ranked affiliate in the market (behind WTVJ and WPLG). As a result, NBC decided that it needed to acquire its own station in the growing South Florida metropolitan area.

The network got its chance at doing so in the late 1980s, when Kohlberg Kravis Roberts put WTVJ on the market. NBC's then-corporate parent General Electric purchased that station in 1987, but WTVJ's affiliation contract with CBS was not set to expire until December 1988. CBS was willing to let WTVJ out of its contract one year early. However, Ed Ansin was not interested in letting NBC out of its affiliation agreement with WSVN, which also expired at the same time; Ansin even made an unsuccessful petition to the FCC to stop NBC's purchase of WTVJ. He wanted channel 7 to air NBC's strong fall 1988 lineup, which included NBC Sports' coverage of Major League Baseball's World Series and the Summer Olympics, along with most Miami Dolphins games as part of NBC's National Football League package.

As a result, NBC was forced to run WTVJ as a CBS affiliate for more than a year, with all of the NBC shows that were preempted by WSVN airing on WTVJ instead. This situation did not sit well with either network. Ansin made an offer to take the CBS affiliation, but CBS turned the offer down. Instead, CBS bought Miami's longtime independent station and original Fox affiliate, WCIX channel 6, even though that station had an inadequate signal in Broward County (WCIX's transmitter was located in Homestead, farther southwest than those of other Miami area stations, to avoid signal interference with WCPX-TV (now WKMG-TV) in Orlando and WPTV). In May 1988, Ed Ansin filed an antitrust lawsuit against General Electric/NBC and CBS, one week after he had claimed that CBS backed out of contract negotiations to affiliate with WSVN. With WCIX planning to switch to CBS at the start of 1989, Fox began negotiations with other area stations to carry its programming. It ultimately reached an agreement with Sunbeam Television to affiliate with channel 7.

Fox affiliation
On January 1, 1989, South Florida's first network affiliation switch occurred, with NBC moving to WTVJ full-time, WCIX switching from Fox to CBS, and WSVN taking the Fox affiliation. Channel 7 had far fewer network shows to preempt as a result, as Fox only ran prime time programming on weekends at the time and would not air an entire week's worth of programming until 1993. As a result, WSVN was for essential intents and purposes programmed as a de facto independent station (even referring to itself as such in promotions regarding the switch, despite still being affiliated with a network). Until Fox began airing programming every weeknight, WSVN aired a movie in prime time at 8:00 p.m. on nights where network programming was not scheduled to air. WSVN's affiliation with Fox could be seen as a major coup for the fledgling network, as WSVN had been a longtime NBC affiliate and Fox was pleased to affiliate with a station that had been with a "Big Three" network for years. At the time, WSVN was one of the largest heritage "Big Three" stations to join Fox. The combination of WSVN not following a similar pattern to other Fox affiliates at the time (which focused more on syndicated programming and movies, than news), and WCIX becoming a "Big Three" affiliate had also led then-struggling independent WDZL (channel 39, now CW affiliate WSFL-TV) to rise to a higher profile, as WDZL had picked up many shows that were formerly seen on WCIX (now WFOR-TV on channel 4). WSVN, meanwhile, picked up some of WCIX's movie packages, as well as a couple of cartoons that it aired on Saturday and Sunday mornings.

Instead of acquiring a large amount of off-network sitcoms and cartoons, WSVN opted to pour most of its resources into its news department and took on a news-intensive format—expanding its newscasts to seven hours on weekdays—a move that was pilloried at the time since its newscasts had consistently finished well behind WTVJ and WPLG in the ratings. Because of this, the station had a higher local newscast output than the rest of Fox's stations did at the time of the switch; when WSVN became a Fox affiliate, only a small number of Fox stations ran local newscasts, which were largely limited to late prime time slots (as of 2014, about three-fourths of Fox's stations have morning newscasts, but only about one-third of its owned-and-operated stations and affiliates carry newscasts in either the midday or late afternoon/early evening time periods). In addition to newscasts, WSVN began to air a lot of first-run syndicated talk shows, court shows, and off-network drama series. As Fox lacked a national evening newscast (a situation which continues to this day), the station also ran a half-hour late afternoon simulcast of CNN Headline News during the early and mid-1990s.

The station ran some cartoons on weekend mornings as well. In the early 1990s, the station added a few off-network sitcoms to its schedule such as Designing Women, The Golden Girls, and Empty Nest (the latter two being set in Miami).

As a Fox affiliate, the station brands itself as "WSVN 7", rather than "Fox 7" under Fox's branding guidelines for its owned-and-operated stations and affiliates (Boston sister station WHDH formerly used its affiliated network's name in its branding as "7 NBC" until it became an independent station in January 2017, although NBC is not as strict with station branding as Fox is), and is one of a handful of Fox affiliates that omit network references entirely from their branding. However, Fox News Channel refers to the station as "Fox 7" when carrying WSVN's coverage of breaking news stories from South Florida; until its website was remodeled in late 2009, the Fox logo also occasionally appeared in a rolling marquee alongside the station's "circle 7" logo on the top left hand corner of the site. At the time of the 1989 switch, the network's owned-and-operated stations and certain affiliates were the only Fox stations to use full network references, while other stations—like original Miami affiliate WCIX used limited to no references to Fox in their branding. Miami–Fort Lauderdale is one of three U.S. television markets in which the Fox affiliation had moved from one VHF station to another (the others being Honolulu, Hawaii, if stations not operating as satellites are counted, as Fox charter affiliate KHNL (channel 13) and NBC affiliate KHON-TV (channel 2) swapped affiliations on January 1, 1996, and Boise, Idaho, when CW affiliate KNIN-TV (channel 9) took the Fox affiliation from charter affiliate KTRV (channel 12) on September 1, 2011) and the only known instance of a longtime "Big Three" affiliate switching to Fox prior to its 1994 affiliation agreement with New World Communications and the affiliation transactions that resulted from the deal.

On January 14, 2012, WSVN and Boston sister stations WHDH and WLVI were pulled from DirecTV after negotiations with Sunbeam Television on a new carriage contract broke down due to a proposal to increase retransmission fees paid to the company by a reported 300%. In response, a Facebook page called "Boycott WSVN" was started to pressure businesses to pull their advertising from the station. However, WSVN did allow DirecTV customers to view the NFC championship game and an episode of American Idol that aired immediately after the game while negotiations were still ongoing. Sunbeam and DirecTV reached a new carriage deal on January 26, 2012, ending the blackout.

On September 27, 2017, three workers were killed after a crane collapsed off the side of WSVN's television tower. The tower, shared with WPLG, was having to install a new transmitter for WSVN as part of the mandated FCC spectrum repack.

Averted loss of Fox affiliation
On February 22, 2018, it was reported that Sinclair Broadcast Group would sell CW affiliate WSFL-TV to Fox Television Stations as part of its larger deal to acquire WSFL parent Tribune Media; the deal was officially announced on May 9, 2018. A purchase of WSFL by FTS would likely result in WSFL becoming a Fox O&O and WSVN losing its affiliation, similar to sister station WHDH in Boston losing its NBC affiliation to WBTS-LD (now Telemundo O&O WYCN-LD in Providence, Rhode Island) after NBC purchased that station; executives at Fox parent company 21st Century Fox declined to immediately announce any plans regarding WSFL in an earnings call, with CEO Lachlan Murdoch stating that "We're not making any announcements of any affiliate changes today." On May 11, 2018, Ed Ansin stated that WSVN would remain a Fox affiliate through at least June 30, 2019 (when its affiliation contract was scheduled to expire), and that WSVN would be run as a news-intensive independent station modeled on WHDH if the Fox affiliation was lost; in an interview with the Sun-Sentinel, Ansin said that Fox had not informed him of its intentions, and that the station would replace Fox's prime time programming with syndicated programming and an additional newscast.

Three weeks after the FCC's July 18, 2018, vote to have the deal reviewed by an administrative law judge amid "serious concerns" about Sinclair's forthrightness in its applications to sell certain conflict properties, on August 9, 2018, Tribune announced it would terminate the Sinclair deal, intending to seek other M&A opportunities. The termination of said merger also made the Fox purchase of WSFL unsuccessful. On December 3, 2018, Irving, Texas-based Nexstar Media Group announced it would acquire the assets of Tribune Media for $6.4 billion in cash and debt, but the fate of Fox's affiliation in Miami remained in question. On March 20, 2019, WSFL was agreed to be divested to Cincinnati-based E. W. Scripps Company upon the consummation of the Nexstar-Tribune merger, as part of the company's sale of nineteen Nexstar- and Tribune-operated stations to Scripps and Tegna Inc. in separate deals worth $1.32 billion. Scripps chose to retain the CW affiliation for the market. On September 26, 2019, WSVN announced that it had renewed its Fox affiliation.

Programming
When WSVN became a Fox affiliate in January 1989, its programming format was quite unusual for the network's affiliates as it did not include sitcoms as part of its schedule; it ran cartoons only on weekend mornings, and aired a heavy amount of talk and court shows, some movies, and some drama series. As time went on, though, most Fox stations began relying more on talk and court shows, as well as local newscasts. Channel 7 runs only a slightly heavier amount of local news programming than other Fox stations (which have gradually increased their news outputs over the last 15 years). WSVN continues not to feature any sitcoms as part of its syndication inventory, somewhat atypical for a news-intensive Fox station.

Past program preemptions and deferrals
As an NBC affiliate, WCKT/WSVN aired a local newscast in place of programs that NBC had aired at noon on weekdays. It also occasionally preempted network shows that aired during the 10:00 a.m. or 11:00 a.m. timeslot (but ran at least one of these hours) and preempted an occasional prime time program. While NBC was traditionally far less tolerant of program preemptions than the other major broadcast networks, it did not mind this at first provided that the network was able to get Miami area independent stations to air whatever programs that WSVN chose not to air. In addition, NBC programs that were not broadcast by WSVN were cleared by WPTV, whose signal provides city-grade coverage of Fort Lauderdale and was available on nearly every cable provider in the area. However, in the early 1980s, WPTV was removed from some Miami area cable systems to make room for new channels due to limited headend channel capacity. Largely due to those preemptions, WCKT/WSVN was one of NBC's weaker affiliates. Though NBC continued to arrange for independent stations to air network programs that were not shown on WSVN, the network grew increasingly annoyed at having to resort to such an arrangement in what had grown into a major market.

As a Fox affiliate, it originally aired Fox Kids when Fox launched the block on September 8, 1990, but would become the first Fox station in the country to stop carrying the block in 1993. Fox Kids subsequently moved to WDZL, before moving again to WAMI (channel 69) in 1998. WBFS-TV (channel 33) aired the successor 4Kids TV block until it ended on December 27, 2008. By coincidence, when New World Communications switched most of its "Big Three"-affiliated stations to Fox between 1994 and 1996, the programming on those stations was very similar in format to WSVN, except that their news formats may have been aimed at an older audience than WSVN's, many stations owned by New World also passed on Fox Kids just as WSVN did.

Since Fox acquired National Hot Rod Association (NHRA) broadcast rights in 2016, WSVN has constantly been the target of viewer and NHRA complaints, the station preempts Fox NHRA in favor of infomercials, resulting in the NHRA sending a formal complaint on their website. This usually amounts to four NHRA events a season, including the U.S. Nationals. The station often preempts live coverage of the NHRA and German Bundesliga soccer matches to after the late news in order to retain paid programming revenue for those afternoon timeslots that Fox uses to carry prestigious sporting events.

Sports programming
In 1966, with the establishment of the Miami Dolphins of the American Football League, the station, via NBC, which held the league's broadcast rights, became the station of record for the new team. The station provided coverage of the Dolphins' victory in Super Bowl VII after their perfect season in 1972. The station during this time also provided local coverage of Super Bowls III, V, and XIII, which were hosted at the Miami Orange Bowl. This alliance continued until the end of the 1988 season, when most games moved over to WTVJ (today, most games are aired by WFOR). Since 1994, the station airs at least two Dolphins games a season via the NFL on Fox, usually when the team plays host to an NFC team at Hard Rock Stadium, however, starting in 2014, with the institution of the NFL's new broadcast 'cross-flex' rules, more games can be seen on Channel 7 when they are moved from WFOR, and from 2018 to 2021, via Fox's exclusive contract, Thursday Night Football games. In addition, any Miami Marlins games featured as part of Fox's MLB broadcast contract are aired on channel 7, this included their victory in the 2003 World Series, when the team was still the Florida Marlins. The station was also the local broadcaster of Super Bowl LIV which was held at Hard Rock Stadium, as Fox had the national television rights to the game; it also previously served as the home broadcaster of Super Bowl XXXIII which was also on Fox. In 1996 as it carried the NHL on Fox, it also carried the first and only appearance of the National Hockey League's Florida Panthers (Games 1 and 3, with the others on ESPN) in that year's Stanley Cup Finals, albeit a sweep by the Colorado Avalanche.

News operation
WSVN presently broadcasts  hours of locally produced newscasts each week (with  hours each weekday and six hours each on Saturdays and Sundays). For the longest time, the station had the highest local newscast output of any local television station in Miami, until ABC affiliate WPLG began producing an additional 16 hours of newscasts for CW affiliate WSFL-TV in June 2021 (giving the former a combined 70½ hours each week), putting WSVN as the second highest. Unlike other news-intensive Fox affiliates, WSVN carries newscasts at 5:00 p.m., 6:00 p.m., and 6:30 p.m. on both Saturdays and Sundays (others either air early evening newscasts on weekends at different times on Saturdays and Sundays [i.e., Saturdays at 6:00 p.m. and Sundays at 5:00 p.m.], air them either at only 5:00 p.m. or 6:00 p.m. on both nights or do not carry newscasts in that particular weekend time period at all); however, WSVN's weekend 5:00 p.m. and 6:00 p.m. newscasts are subject to preemption and/or delay due to network sports telecasts running into the timeslot. In addition, the station produces the entertainment news/lifestyle program Deco Drive (which airs at 7:30 p.m. weeknights). The station is affiliated with CNN for news.

When the station gained the Fox affiliation on January 1, 1989, it retained a news schedule similar to the one it had as an NBC affiliate, in its early years with Fox, local news programming on the station ran on weekdays from 6:00 a.m. to 9:00 a.m., Noon to 1:00 p.m., 5:00 p.m. to 7:00 p.m., weekends from 6:00 p.m. to 6:30 p.m. and nightly from 10:00 p.m. to 11:00 p.m. The station became the second Fox affiliate to have a weekday morning newscast as a result and was the first one with weeknight 5:00 p.m. and 6:00 p.m. newscasts. On the date of the network switch, WSVN debuted a locally produced early evening news magazine program, Inside Story, the program eventually evolved into its present entertainment-based format as 7:30 (in reference to its timeslot) in 1991, and later changed its title to the current Deco Drive in 1996.

Under news director Joel Cheatwood, WSVN became well known in South Florida, and throughout the nation, for its emphasis on crime stories and sensationalistic reporting—summarized in the phrase, "if it bleeds, it leads." Although this embrace of tabloid television was criticized, it rejuvenated a station that had languished in third place for most of its tenure with NBC. Within a few years, with anchor Rick Sanchez at the helm, WSVN became the market's highest-rated English-language station from sign-on to sign-off, a rank it would hold for the better part of two decades until it was overtaken for the title by WFOR, though WSVN has been a solid runner-up and has tied for second with WPLG.

WSVN's success also influenced how newscasts on other Fox affiliates would look in later years; the station's decision to take on a news-intensive schedule would eventually serve as the template for the programming formats of the former "Big Three" stations that switched to Fox as a result of its 1994 affiliation agreement with New World Communications and certain transactions related to the deal, and was gradually adopted by many heritage Fox stations and certain news-producing stations that are not affiliated with the network, NBC, CBS or ABC. It was also the first station to take a cue from CNN, integrating its newsroom and studio into one large area, which the station has termed the "newsplex". It evolved out of their initial two sets around the time of the network switch in the late 1980s: one used for its morning and 5:00 p.m. newscasts, which was a small, enclosed area in the newsroom, and its main set, which was positioned in the station's control room. Other stations and networks, both in the U.S. and internationally, have taken cues from WSVN's set. The overall format was successful enough in Miami that in 1993, Ed Ansin assigned Cheatwood to overhaul Sunbeam's newly acquired Boston station WHDH, incorporating a considerably watered-down version of the WSVN format for its newscasts; as in Miami, the tabloid style helped WHDH rise from a perennial third place into a contender for first in the news ratings (against the more traditional WCVB-TV). WHDH uses many visual cues taken from WSVN including the use of flashy graphics, distinct music packages composed by Chris Crane (who has composed the various custom news themes used by WSVN since 1991) and a similarly designed "newsplex" set; WSVN's "circle 7" logo was also adopted by WHDH after Sunbeam assumed ownership. A similar format was adopted by KJRH-TV in Tulsa, Oklahoma between 1994 and 1997, that station has since reverted to airing traditional newscasts.

The station's 11:00 p.m. newscast evolved into an hour-long 10:00 p.m. program after it joined Fox, but was revived in 1995 as a 15-minute wrap-up of the proceedings in the O. J. Simpson murder case, and expanded to a half-hour the following year, the 11:00 p.m. newscast expanded to weekend evenings on September 26, 2009. The station debuted a half-hour 4:00 p.m. newscast on September 11, 2006, which later expanded to one hour in 2007. On January 11, 2009, starting with its 5:00 p.m. newscast, WSVN became the second station in the Miami market (behind WTVJ) to begin broadcasting its local newscasts in high definition. With the switch to HD, came an updated newsplex set that premiered two weeks earlier on December 29, 2008, and new HD graphics. On July 11, 2010, WSVN expanded its Saturday and Sunday 6:00 p.m. newscasts to one hour with the addition of half-hour newscasts at 6:30 p.m. On August 22, 2011, WSVN added a fifth hour (from 9:00 a.m. to 10:00 a.m.) to the weekday edition of Today in Florida, by way of the move of Live! with Regis and Kelly to WPLG. On September 13, 2015, the station expanded its Today in Florida newscast to Sunday mornings airing from 8:00 a.m. to 11:00 a.m.

Notable former on-air staff

 Jessica Aguirre – anchor (later at KABC-TV, then at KGO-TV, now at KNTV)
 Jim Berry – sports anchor (now morning news anchor at WFOR-TV, also in Miami) 
 Ann Bishop – script writer (moved to WPLG in Miami and became a legendary anchor, died November 14, 1997)
 Bob Clayton – staff announcer and host of Bobsville (later worked on game shows Concentration and Pyramid, died November 1, 1979)
 Penny Daniels – anchor/reporter (retired)
 Donna Hanover – (ex-wife of former New York City mayor Rudy Giuliani)
 Robb Hanrahan – evening anchor (later at WABC-TV in New York City and at WHP-TV in Harrisburg, Pennsylvania; died July 1, 2022)
 Jackie Johnson – meteorologist (later at KCBS-TV in Los Angeles; retired)
 Alycia Lane – (later at KYW-TV in Philadelphia, last at KNBC in Los Angeles)
 Rick Leventhal – (was at Fox News Channel, departed on June 28, 2021)
 Elita Loresca – meteorologist (now at KTRK-TV in Houston)
 Joan Lovett – anchor/reporter (later at WBBM-TV in Chicago)
 Robin Meade – anchor/reporter (later at HLN)
 Marilyn Mitzel – anchor/reporter (1988–2005)
 Charles Perez – anchor/reporter (later at WABC-TV in New York City, then at WPLG in Miami; retired)
 Jillian Warry (Reynolds) – meteorologist (later at KTTV in Los Angeles)
 Shaun Robinson – (later weekend anchor and correspondent for syndicated entertainment newsmagazine Access Hollywood)
 Rick Sanchez – (1982–2001) (later at MSNBC and then CNN; WIOD and WJAN-CD in Miami–Fort Lauderdale; was most recently at RT America until its closure in 2022)
 Gerry Sandusky – now at WBAL-TV in Baltimore and radio play-by-play broadcaster for the Baltimore Ravens
 Shepard Smith – (was at Fox News Channel from its inception in 1996 until his departure on October 11, 2019, later at CNBC)
 Stephanie Stahl – anchor (later and now at KYW-TV in Philadelphia for health and science reporter)
 Linda Stouffer – (later at HLN; now at WSB-TV in Atlanta. Went by Cinnamon Stouffer during her stint at WSVN)
 Michelle Tuzee – (later at KABC-TV in Los Angeles)

In popular culture
 WSVN's newscasts were featured in at least two movies, The Mean Season (1985) and Flight of the Navigator (1986). WSVN can also be seen in several episodes of Miami Vice before the NBC affiliation for the Miami market moved to WTVJ towards the end of the show's run.

Technical information

Subchannels
The station's digital signal is multiplexed:

WSVN's second digital subchannel carried Estrella TV from its 2009 launch until July 14, 2017, when it began carrying Light TV.

Analog-to-digital transition
WSVN ended programming on its analog signal, on VHF channel 7, on June 12, 2009, the official date in which full-power television stations in the United States transitioned from analog to digital broadcasts. The station's digital signal relocated from its pre-transition VHF channel 8 to channel 7. The station was one of four that operated digital signals on the VHF band to be granted a power increase later that month after stations experienced signal problems on VHF that did not occur with the UHF band following the transition.

Out of market coverage 
WSVN is carried via cable in The Bahamas.

References

External links

SVN
Fox network affiliates
TheGrio affiliates
This TV affiliates
Buzzr affiliates
Television channels and stations established in 1956
Television channels and stations established in 1962
1956 establishments in Florida
National Football League primary television stations